Csmith is a test case generation tool. It can generate random C programs that statically and dynamically conform to the C99 standard. It is used for stress-testing compilers, static analyzers, and other tools that process C code. It is a free, open source, permissively licensed C compiler fuzzer developed by researchers at the University of Utah. It was previously called Randprog.

External links
 University of Utah Csmith webpage
 yarpgen: Yet Another Random Program Generator, yarpgen is a random C/C++ program generator

References

C (programming language) compilers